Cambs is a municipality in the Ludwigslust-Parchim district, in Mecklenburg-Vorpommern, Germany.

Geography
Cambs is located 11 km north east of Schwerin within a large ground moraine area rich of lakes between the Schweriner See and the upper Warnow.
There are three lakes on the municipal area: the s shaped 4 kilometres long Cambser See (lake of Cambs), the Weiße See (white lake) and the Schwarze See (black lake).

Beside the name-giving village Cambs there are four more villages within the municipality Cambs:  Ahrensboek, Brahlstorf, Karnin and Kleefeld.

History
For several centuries the village of Cambs was an important post station at the postal line Schwerin-Güstrow.
Cambs is mentioned documentarily first in 1341.

Infrastructure

Fire brigade
Like most villages around Schwerin Cambs got an auxiliary fire brigade.

Health
Even though Cambs got its local medical practitioner next hospital isn't very far away. Next hospital sites are the specialized rehab hospital in Leezen and the full-fledged hospital 'Helios-Kliniken' in Schwerin.

Transportation
Cambs is situated close to the newly built parts of the Bundesautobahn 14.
The Bundesstraße B 104 goes through Cambs. The parts of this German federal highway close to Cambs are known accident hotspot. For this reason Cambs is a hotspot for traffic supervision by speed cameras as well.

The next train station is located in Schwerin.

Public transport bus service is available. Bus lines connect Cambs with Schwerin, Crivitz, Sternberg and a lot of smaller villages.

Local Law
The municipality of Cambs taxes second residence and dog ownership.

Points of interest
 church of Cambs built in 1856

References

External links

Ludwigslust-Parchim